Clavus beckii is a species of sea snail, a marine gastropod mollusk in the family Drilliidae.

Description
The shell is oblong, cylindrically attenuated, sharp at the apex and six-angled. The whorls are longitudinally tuberculated at the angles.
The entire shell is olive-brown except the tubercles, which are white. The columella and the interior of the mouth are brown. The siphonal canal is very short.

Distribution
This species occurs in the Pacific Ocean off the Philippines and Indonesia.

References

  Reeve, L.A. 1843. Monograph of the genus Pleurotoma. pls 1–18 in Reeve, L.A. (ed.). Conchologica Iconica. London : L. Reeve & Co. Vol. 1.

External links
  Reeve. "On new species of Pleurotoma, Clavatula, and Mangelia." ; Proceedings of the Zoological Society of London pt. 9-11 (1841-1843)

beckii
Gastropods described in 1842